Gareth Lawrence West (born 26 July 1976) is a former New Zealand cricketer for Central Districts cricket team, who played 26 matches in total from 2000 to 2004.

Early life

West was born in July 1976 at New Plymouth in Taranaki, New Zealand. West, along with his brother Regan West, had mixed Irish and New Zealand heritage, enabling Regan to represent Ireland in One Day and Twenty20 Internationals during his own career.

Career

A left-arm fast-medium bowler, West took 36 wickets in 15 first-class cricket matches at 31.72, and 10 more wickets in List-A matches at a weaker 43.20. A bowler rather than a batsman, he only made 76 runs in his first-class career at 5.06, with a career best of 31. In one day matches he was only required to bat seven times from his 11 matches, and five not outs rose his average to 15.00.

He played his first match for Central Districts on 3 November 2000, against Wellington at Marton. He took 1/18 in the first innings, failing to take a wicket in the second, and was not called to bat at all. He went on to play five more matches during this first season, scoring only 21 runs at 4.20, but took 14 wickets at 29.07. He also played three one day matches, scoring 11 runs at 5.50, and taking six wickets at 22.83.

West went on to play only four more four-day matches across the 2002–03 season, enjoying another weak season with the bat: scoring only 35 runs, 31 of which in one innings which inflated his average to 17.50. With the ball he took 12 wickets at 31.91. He played five more one day matches, scoring 16 runs largely in one innings of 12*, however only took one wicket at 196.00. He played a further six first-class matches in 2003–04, scoring 20 runs at 2.50, and taking 10 wickets at 34.70. In one day cricket he only scored 4 runs from three matches, and took three wickets at 33.00. His final match, on 26 February 2004 against Canterbury, saw him score one with the bat, and take one wicket.

Notes

External links
 

1976 births
Living people
Central Districts cricketers
Northern Districts cricketers
New Zealand cricketers
Cricketers from New Plymouth